The Door is a 2012 English-language Hungarian drama film directed by István Szabó and starring Martina Gedeck and Helen Mirren. It is based on the Hungarian novel of the same name concerning the relationship of a novelist (Gedeck) and her eccentric maid (Mirren) in early-1970s Hungary.

The film was selected to be featured in the competition programme at the 34th Moscow International Film Festival. It also won the Michael Curtiz Audience Award at the Hungarian Film Festival of Los Angeles in November 2012.

Cast
 Helen Mirren as Emerenc
 Martina Gedeck as Magda
 Károly Eperjes as Tibor
 Gábor Koncz as The Lt. Colonel
 Enikő Börcsök as Sutu
 Ági Szirtes as Polett
 Erika Marozsán as Eva "Evike" Großman
 Ildikó Tóth as Doctor
 Mari Nagy as Adél
 Péter Andorai as Mr. Brodarics

Awards
 Hungarian Film Festival of Los Angeles – Michael Curtiz Audience Award: The Door (2012)

References

External links
 

2012 films
2012 drama films
Hungarian drama films
2010s English-language films
English-language Hungarian films
Films directed by István Szabó
Films based on Hungarian novels